Nandhikesvarar Temple is a Hindu temple dedicated to the deity Shiva, located at Thenur in Perambalur district, Tamil Nadu, India.

Vaippu Sthalam
It is one of the shrines of the Vaippu Sthalams sung by Tamil Saivite Nayanars Appar and Sambandar. This place is also known as Mathuvapuri.

Presiding deity
The presiding deity in the garbhagriha, represented by the lingam, is known as Nandhikesvarar. The Goddess is known as Mahasambathgowri and Perunthiru Piratti.

Specialities
The presiding deity is very beautiful to look at. In front of the shrine of the presiding deity, in the mandapa, the sculpture of Saraba is found. Renovations have been carried out by Zamindars of Thuraiyur. In the front mandapa, of the east gate, the sculptures of Zambindar and his wife are found in the pillars. Sivaratri and Maham festival are celebrated in this temple.

Structure
In the entrance, at the facade the stucco sculptures of  Vinayaka, Risabarudar, and Subramania are found. After crossing the entrance, the shrine of the goddess is found. She is found in standing posture. It is facing south. The shrine of the presiding deity is facing east. At the entrance of the garbhagriha, on either side dwarapalakas are found. The shrine of the goddess is facing south. In the prakara temple vahanas are kept. Kartikeya with peacock is found. Sculptures of Bairava, Surya and Navagraha are found. The compound wall is found in a dilapidated condition. kosta sculptures are found in the shrines of the presiding deity and the goddess.

Location
The temple is located at Thenur, at a distance of 32 km north in Trichy-Thuraiyur road, via Ethumalai, in north. This temple can be reached from Thiruppattur Brahmapurisvarar Temple, which is located at a distance of 11 km in north west. One time puja is held in this temple daily. The temple is found in the Thenur bus stop.

References

Hindu temples in Perambalur district